Mospanov is a rural locality (a khutor) in Novooskolsky District, Belgorod Oblast, Russia. The population was 301 as of 2010. There are 3 streets.

Geography 
Mospanov is located 32 km northeast of Novy Oskol (the district's administrative centre) by road. Bolshaya Ivanovka is the nearest rural locality.

References 

Rural localities in Novooskolsky District

Renamed localities of Belgorod Oblast